is  the assistant coach of the Saint Mary's Gaels men's basketball in the NCAA.

Head coaching record

|-
| style="text-align:left;"|Hyogo Storks
| style="text-align:left;"|2013-14
| 54||9||45|||| style="text-align:center;"|5th in Western|||-||-||-||
| style="text-align:center;"|-
|- 
| style="text-align:left;"|Hyogo Storks
| style="text-align:left;"|2014
| 18||10||8|||| style="text-align:center;"|Fired|||-||-||-||
| style="text-align:center;"|-
|- 
|-

References

1974 births
Living people
Nishinomiya Storks coaches
UC Davis Aggies men's basketball players
San Francisco Dons men's basketball coaches
Saint Mary's Gaels men's basketball coaches
UC Santa Barbara Gauchos men's basketball coaches
University of California, Davis alumni